The SACI-1 was a microsatellite of scientific applications, designed, developed, constructed and tested by Brazilian technicians, engineers and scientists working in INPE (National Institute of Space Research). SACI-1 was launched on October 14, 1999, from the Taiyuan Satellite Launch Center, China, by means of a Long March 4B rocket, as a secondary payload at the CBERS-1 launch.

Features 
The "SACI" satellites are composed of a multi-mission platform and a set of experiments that constitute the payload. These satellites had the cooperation of several Brazilian and foreign institutions.

The SACI-1 scientific satellite has the following characteristics:

 Format: parallelepiped with 60 cm x 40 cm x 40 cm
 Mass: 60 kg
 Orbit: heliosynchronous
 Stabilization: by rotation (6 rpm)
 Precision: 1 degree

Energy supply 
 Solar Cells: Gallium Arsenide (AsGa)
 Dimensions: 3 panels of 57 x 44 cm
 Efficiency: 19%
 Power output: 150W
 Nickel Cadmium (NiCd) Battery Cells
 Voltage: 1.4 V
 Capacity: 4.5 Ah
 Remote control rate: 19.2 kbit/s
 Transmission rate: 500 kbit/s
 Antennas of edge: 2 of transmission and 2 of reception, type Microstrip
 Operating frequency telemetry / remote control: 2,250 GHz / 2,028 GHz
 Receiving antenna in Soil: 3.4 m in diameter

Mission 
Although the launch went smoothly, and the intended orbit reached, SACI-1 did not come into operation, probably due to a failure in the solar panel control system.

References

External links 
 SACI-1 Gunter's Space Page

Satellites of Brazil